Anolis inderenae is a species of lizard in the family Dactyloidae. The species is found in Colombia.

References

Anoles
Endemic fauna of Colombia
Reptiles of Colombia
Reptiles described in 1988